Andrew Doyle  is a playwright, journalist, and political satirist from Northern Ireland, who has written for the fictional character Jonathan Pie and created the character Titania McGrath. Doyle joined GB News in 2021, and hosts a weekly show titled Free Speech Nation.

Early life and education 
Doyle is from an Irish Catholic background, and was born in Derry, Northern Ireland. He completed his undergraduate studies at Aberystwyth University before obtaining a Masters degree at the University of York. He holds a doctorate in early Renaissance poetry from the University of Oxford, having studied at Wadham College, Oxford.

Career 
Doyle regularly writes for Spiked, and runs a comedy night in London called Comedy Unleashed. He has performed his stand-up shows at the Edinburgh Fringe Festival, four of which have also been performed at the Soho Theatre, London. He has appeared on Sky News as a commentator, and as a panel-member on The Moral Maze on BBC Radio 4. He has been a speaker at the Battle of Ideas Festival in London, an annual event hosted by the Institute of Ideas.

He is also a visiting research fellow at Queen's University, Belfast. Doyle originally worked as a teacher, including alongside Simon Warr at Royal Hospital School.

He created the fictional character of Titania McGrath in April 2018 through the creation of an anonymous Twitter account for the character. This parody account was, according to Doyle, designed to mock contemporary "woke culture", as "the majority of people are desperate for this culture to be mocked". McGrath's Twitter account has been suspended for alleged hate speech four times, notably on 9 December 2018, her account has more than 500,000 followers. Doyle has written two books under the guise of the character. The first was Woke: A Guide to Social Justice published 7 March 2019 and a children's book, My First Little Book of Intersectional Activism published September 2020. In March 2019, Doyle was contacted by Rosamund Urwin, a journalist at The Sunday Times, who asked whether he was the person behind McGrath's Twitter account, due to the inclusion of several sources in McGrath's book that he had quoted previously. Though he denied it, he later revealed himself as the man behind the account.

In February 2019, Doyle wrote a text in The Independent under the pseudonym Liam Evans. The piece expressed dismay at comedy material performed on stage. After admitting he wrote the text, Doyle said it so clearly was a hoax, but that the newspaper had published it without sufficiently checking the writer. The Independent'''s executive editor said that "The suggestion [...] that it is so outlandish that it must be false, is bizarre." Doyle also pointed out that if reading the fourth letter of every sentence in the text, it spells out "Titania McGrath wrote this you gullible hacks".

Since 2021, Doyle has hosted a weekly show titled Free Speech Nation on GB News. He also appears as an occasional commentator or presenter in other shows on GB News.

 Political views 
Doyle describes himself as left-wing and criticises political correctness and identity politics. He is a Brexit supporter. Doyle supported Jeremy Corbyn during the 2017 United Kingdom general election.

 Publications 
Doyle is the co-author with Tom Walker of Jonathan Pie: Off the Record (2017). He is also the author of Titania McGrath's Woke: A Guide to Social Justice (2019). It was positively received by a large number of celebrities including Ricky Gervais, as well as numerous right-leaning commentators. It was negatively reviewed by Alex Clark in The Guardian, writing that Doyle was making a cheap shot by poking fun at identity politics. Doyle used the Titania McGrath pseudonym for My First Little Book of Intersectional Activism (2020), published by Little, Brown in September 2020. He is the author of Free Speech and Why It Matters (2021) and The New Puritans: How the Religion of Social Justice Captured the Western World (2022).

Personal life
Doyle is gay. His uncle is political activist Eamonn Melaugh.

Plays
 Borderland Jimmy Murphy Makes Amends (BBC Radio 4)
 The Second Mr Bailey (BBC Radio 4)
 Reacher's Point (BBC Radio 4)

 Bibliography 
 Jonathan Pie: Off the Record (2017) 
 Titania McGrath's Woke: A Guide to Social Justice (2019) 
 Titania McGrath's: My First Little Book of Intersectional Activism (2020)
 Free Speech and Why It Matters (2021)
 The New Puritans: How the Religion of Social Justice Captured the Western World'' (2022)

References

Living people
Male comedians from Northern Ireland
Satirists from Northern Ireland
Comedy writers from Northern Ireland
Gay comedians
Alumni of Wadham College, Oxford
Year of birth missing (living people)
Writers from Derry (city)
GB News newsreaders and journalists
21st-century LGBT people from Northern Ireland
Gay writers from Northern Ireland
Free speech activists
Activists from Northern Ireland
Mass media people from Derry (city)
LGBT comedians from Northern Ireland